Aligner may refer to
 Aligner (semiconductor) - a technology used in photoresist creation for creating integrated circuits
 Clear aligners - an orthodontic tool